Easier with Practice is a 2009 American drama film written and directed by Kyle Patrick Alvarez. It stars Brian Geraghty, Kel O'Neill, Marguerite Moreau, Jeanette Brox, Jenna Gavigan and Katie Aselton. The story is based on the 2006 GQ article "What Are You Wearing?" by Davy Rothbart.

The film was nominated for an Independent Spirit Award for Best First Feature and won the Someone to Watch Award for Alvarez.

Plot
Davy Mitchell is an introverted writer struggling on tour to promote his unpublished short stories. His lonely nights heat up when Davy receives a seemingly random phone call from a woman named Nicole. The sultry stranger seduces him into an intense session of phone sex, sparking an erotic and intimate relationship that is based entirely around the phone calls that she initiates. Davy wants to make it work, but he becomes frustrated when she refuses to give out her number. Fed up with her games, he determines to meet Nicole in person. That is, if she ever calls again.

Cast
 Brian Geraghty as Davy Mitchell
 Kel O'Neill as Sean Mitchell
 Marguerite Moreau as Samantha
 Jeanette Brox as Sarah
 Jenna Gavigan as Josie
 Katie Aselton as Nicole

Production
Director Kyle Patrick Alvarez was inspired by a GQ article written by Davy Rothbart. Filming on Easier with Practice began in the summer of 2008.

The film was produced by Forty Second Productions with a Red One camera system.

Release
Easier with Practice had its world premiere at the CineVegas Film Festival, where it won the 2009 Grand Jury Prize. Its international premiere was at the Edinburgh International Film Festival, where it garnered Best New International Feature. Easier with Practice was theatrically released in New York City and Los Angeles on February 26, 2010. It was also distributed in Canada by Mongrel Media. 

The film was rated NC-17 by the Motion Picture Association of America. Though the film does not feature any nudity, the rating was supposedly given for the graphic sexual dialogue.

Home media 
The film was released on DVD by Breaking Glass Pictures on April 6, 2010.

Reception 
On review aggregate website Rotten Tomatoes, Easier with Practice has an approval rating of 88% based on 34 reviews. The site's critics consensus reads, "This promising debut from writer-director Kyle Patrick Alvarez is anchored by a startlingly honest and tender performance from Brian Geraghty that helps make Easier with Practice more than just another road trip drama." 

Justin Chang of Variety called it "a quietly provocative love story about emotionally stunted manhood and the risks some guys will take to connect." Scott Tobias of The A.V. Club wrote, "Love stories don't come much squirmier than this one, and Alvarez plays it with honesty, insight, and the awkwardness inherent in this blindest of blind dates." Peter Bradshaw of The Guardian said "The film is a slow-burner: a study in loneliness and alienation, whose unexpected ending and ambiguous aftermath require us to reassess all that has gone before."

Awards
 2010 Independent Spirit Awards 
 Best First Feature - nominated
 Someone to Watch Award - Kyle Patrick Alvarez, winner
 2009 CineVegas International Film Festival - Grand Jury Award, winner
 2009 Edinburgh International Film Festival - Best New International Feature, winner
 2009 Memphis Indie Film Festival - Special Jury Prize, winner

References

External links
 
 
 
 
 
 Easier with Practice at Mongrel Media

2009 films
2009 directorial debut films
2009 drama films
2009 independent films
2000s drama road movies
American drama films
American drama road movies
Films about writers
Films directed by Kyle Patrick Alvarez
2000s English-language films
2000s American films